Andrzej Kolikowski (1954 – 5 December 1999), nicknamed Pershing, was the leader of the so-called Pruszków mafia in Poland and arguably the best-known Polish gangster of the 1990s. He was assassinated by his enemies while on vacation in Zakopane.

Kolikowski was born in Ożarów Mazowiecki. He was first arrested by the police at the age of 17. When he graduated from a car service school, he started working for a local cable factory. In 1980s he first went to West Germany, from where he started smuggling dollars, cars and other goods unavailable in communist-controlled Poland. There he also met his later accomplices: Jeremiasz Barański (Baranina) and Nikodem Skotarczak (Nikoś). He invested the money in an illegal casino opened in Warsaw in late 1980s.

In 1989, Kolikowski formed a group of roughly 100 people supporting his business. Among the best-known of its members were Mirosław Danielak (nicknamed Malizna), Leszek Danielak (Wańka), Zygmunt Raźniak (Bolo), Andrzej Banasiak (Słowik), Ryszard Szwarc (Kajtek) and Janusz Prasol (Parasol). In 1992 the group joined the Pruszków mafia, the largest and the most influential mob at the time. As one of its leaders, Kolikowski started investing in legal ventures: record labels, restaurants, discos and such. He is also often credited as the person behind the popularity of "disco polo" music genre, promoted by the labels he owned or sponsored.

In 1994 he survived the first of assassination attempts: a bomb had been planted under his car. In August of that year he was arrested by the police, together with 19 members of the Pruszków group. Accused of extortion, handling, counterfeit and coercion, two years later he was sentenced to four years in prison. About that time his group divided and one of the off-springs gained notoriety under the command of Marek Czarnecki (Rympałek).

Kolikowski left prison in 1998 and returned to his former activities. However, by that time the war over control of the Pruszków mafia was raging and his position was seriously endangered. In addition, one of the off-springs created after the arrest of the initial chiefs of the Pruszków group - dubbed the Wołomin mafia - gained much influence. While on vacation, Kolikowski was killed in a shooting in Zakopane on December 5, 1999.  Ryszard Bogucki was convicted for the murder of Kolikowski and sentenced to 25 years' imprisonment, with the possibility of parole after 20 years.

References

1954 births
1999 deaths
20th-century Polish criminals
Polish gangsters
Murdered gangsters
Extortionists
Forgers
Polish murder victims
People murdered in Poland
Polish prisoners and detainees
Prisoners and detainees of Poland